TXU or txu may refer to:

TXU Corporation (formerly "Texas Utilities") a USA group companies
TXU Energy, energy generation subsidiary of TXU Corp.
TXU Energi, subsidiary of TXU Europe, formerly "The Energy Company"
txu, ISO:639 code for the Kayapo language
TXU Energie Braunschweig, German basketball team